The High Commissioner of Australia to Mauritius is an officer of the Australian Department of Foreign Affairs and Trade and the head of the High Commission of the Commonwealth of Australia to Mauritius in Port Louis. The first non-resident Australian High Commissioner to Mauritius was appointed in 1971, located in Tanzania, and resident diplomatic representation was first established in 1984. The position has the rank and status of an Ambassador Extraordinary and Plenipotentiary and also holds non-resident accreditation to Seychelles (since 1984, as high commissioner), Madagascar (since 1984, as ambassador), and Comoros (since 1984, as ambassador), as well as having consular responsibility for the island of Réunion, an overseas department and region of France. The position is currently vacant, with the head of mission being Keara Shaw as acting high commissioner and Chargée d’Affaires since 1 August 2022. The work of the high commissioner is supported by the Australian Consulate in Antananarivo, Madagascar, led by honorary consul Scott Reid since November 2016.

Posting history
On 25 September 1971, Australia established diplomatic relations with Mauritius, with the High Commissioner resident in Dar es Salaam, Tanzania receiving non-resident accreditation until 1984. From 1976 to 1984 the high commissioner in Kenya was accredited to the Seychelles. On 29 April 1976, it was announced that Australia and Madagascar had agreed to establish diplomatic relations, with the Australian High Commissioner to Tanzania receiving non-resident accreditation as ambassador. The first ambassador, Frederick Truelove, presented his credentials on 3 May 1976. In 1983, non-resident accreditation was briefly held by the Tanzania high commission for Comoros. With the establishment of the High Commission in Port Louis, the non-resident accreditations for Seychelles, Comoros, and Madagascar, were transferred to the Mauritius post.

In early 1984, the new Australian Government of Bob Hawke undertook a policy of increased engagement with the states of the Indian Ocean. In January 1984 Foreign Minister Bill Hayden noted in a press release that Australia has an important role in "ensuring secure lines of communications for its trade with and civil aviation traffic through the region, and in promoting regional concern for peace and stability. Australia would also become increasingly important to the region as a trading partner and as a source of aid, training, technology and investment." As part of this new policy, in February 1984 it was announced that a resident high commission was to be established in the island state of Mauritius, which had been an independent member of the Commonwealth since 1968. The resident Australian High Commission to Mauritius was opened on 24 March 1984, initially under an acting high commissioner. The first resident high commissioner, Rod Irwin, took up his appointment in September 1984, and presented his letters of commission on 10 September 1984.

In November 2016, the Australian Consulate in Antananarivo, Madagascar, was established, with local Australian-born businessman Scott Reid appointed as honorary consul, and was officially opened by Susan Coles as ambassador to Madagascar on 7 May 2017.

High Commissioners

Notes
 Also non-resident Ambassador to Madagascar, 1976–1984, 1984–present.
 Also non-resident Ambassador to Comoros, 1983–1984, 1984–present.
 Also non-resident High Commissioner to the Seychelles, 1984–present.

References

External links

Australian High Commission, Mauritius
High Commission of Australia – Mauritius Ministry of Foreign Affairs, Regional Integration and International Trade

Australia–Mauritius relations
Australia–Madagascar relations
Mauritius
Australia